Julie Mary Greig (born 20 August 1960) is a former Australian politician. She was the Liberal member for Reynell in the South Australian House of Assembly from 1993 until 1997, when she was defeated by Gay Thompson.

References

 

1960 births
Living people
Members of the South Australian House of Assembly
Liberal Party of Australia members of the Parliament of South Australia
Women members of the South Australian House of Assembly